is the ninth album by the Japanese girl idol group Berryz Kobo, released on January 30, 2013 in Japan on the record label Piccolo Town.

Compositions 
As usual for a Berryz Kobo album, it is entirely written and produced by Tsunku, with exception of the music of the song "Cha Cha Sing".

In total, there are ten tracks on the CD. The album contains the title tracks from three previously released hit singles: "Be Genki (Naseba Naru!)", "Cha Cha Sing", and "Want!", a remix of the Berryz' first single "Anata Nashi de wa Ikite Yukenai", and a remix of "Momochi! Yurushite-nyan Taisō" from the single "Cha Cha Sing". There are also five new songs.

Release details 
The album is available in two editions: regular (PKCP-5224) and limited (PKCP-5222/3). The regular edition is CD-only, the limited edition comes with a DVD.  A limited issue of the regular edition comes with a member photo, randomly selected from seven kinds. There is one photo of each member in the set,included in the sealed album.

Track listing

Charts

References

External links 
 Profile on the Up-Front Works website 
 Profile on the Hello! Project website 

2013 albums
Berryz Kobo albums